Mateo Romero may refer to:
Mateo Romero (artist) (born 1966), Native American painter.
Mateo Romero (composer) (c.1575–1647), Belgian-born Spanish composer, master of the imperial chapel.